Goolsbee is a surname.  Notable people with the surname include:

 Austan Goolsbee (born 1969), American economist
 Jennifer Goolsbee (born 1968), US-born German ice dancer